{{DISPLAYTITLE:C25H35NO4}}
The molecular formula C25H35NO4 (molar mass: 413.54 g/mol, exact mass: 413.2566 u) may refer to:

 Dihydroetorphine, an analgesic drug
 Norbuprenorphine

Molecular formulas